The Bribe is a 1949 American film noir directed by Robert Z. Leonard and written by Marguerite Roberts, based on a story written by Frederick Nebel. The drama features Robert Taylor, Ava Gardner, Charles Laughton, and Vincent Price.

Plot
Federal agent Rigby (Robert Taylor) travels to Los Trancos on the island of Carlotta (somewhere off the coast of Central America) to break up a war-surplus aircraft engine racket and finds himself tempted by corruption, namely Elizabeth Hintten (Ava Gardner), a café singer married to Tug Hintten (John Hodiak), a drunken ex-pilot.

Carwood (Vincent Price) is the brains of the outfit, aided and abetted by J.J. Bealer (Charles Laughton) and Hintten.

Cast
 Robert Taylor as Rigby
 Ava Gardner as Elizabeth Hintten
 Charles Laughton as J.J. Bealer
 Vincent Price as Carwood
 John Hodiak as Tugwell 'Tug' Hintten
 Samuel S. Hinds as Dr. Warren
 John Hoyt as Gibbs
 Martin Garralaga as Pablo Gomez

Reception

Box office
According to MGM records the movie earned $1,559,000 in the U.S. and Canada and $951,000 overseas, resulting in a loss to the studio of $322,000.

Critical reception
Film critic Bosley Crowther lambasted the drama in his film review, writing "If you plan to put down your money to see the Capitol's The Bribe, we suggest that you be prepared to write off this extravagance as a folly and nothing more. For The Bribe is the sort of temptation which Hollywood put in the way of gullible moviegoers about twenty years ago. It's a piece of pure romantic fiction, as lurid as it is absurd. And if it didn't have several big 'names' in it, it would be low-man on a 'grind house' triple-bill...The only hint which the director, Robert Z. Leonard, gives that he may have meant it all as pure nonsense comes at the very end, when he blows up the place with pyrotechnics. That's the one appropriate move in the whole show."

The Brooklyn Eagle found the film "a synthetic dish, obviously whipped up on one of M-G-M's mammoth back lots with a minimum of juice, nourishment and flavor, meaning conviction and excitement. Or, to put it another way, 'The Bribe' is a melodrama with a transparent facade. You're continually aware of actors busy at make-believe, a director telling them what to do and, in a more remote spot, a writer sweating over his typewriter to think up good, hot situations....Laughton's self-enjoyment at slicing the ham thick is passable fun to watch, which is more than can be said for the others. Taylor, Gardner, Price and Hodiak, they simply put in time and effort, little else."

Time Out film guide included the following in their review: "Price and Laughton make a formidable pair of heavies in this otherwise feeble thriller shot on a cheaply rigged-up corner of the MGM backlot. Taylor isn't up to moral dilemma as a US government agent sent to crack illicit aircraft engine trading in the Caribbean, yet tempted by a lucrative cash offer and the irresistible charm of café chanteuse Gardner."

Critic Leslie Halliwell wrote in his film guide "Steamy melodrama with pretensions but only moderate entertainment value despite high gloss. The rogues gallery, however, are impressive."

In the book Cult Movies, Karl French and Philip French write "In classic noir style, the chain smoking Rigby (he has no Christian name) tells most of the story in flashbacks that begin as visions he sees on the rain-lashed window of his hotel room. His voiceover narration continues as he battles with his conscience and tries to retain his honour in a world reeking of corruption. Laughton and Price are splendidly hammy villains and Gardner's nightclub singer is an innocent femme fatale in the manner of Rita Hayworth's Gilda."

In popular culture
Scenes and characters from The Bribe are used in Dead Men Don't Wear Plaid, a 1982 film parody by Carl Reiner, in which Steve Martin's character is named Rigby and is searching for friends and enemies of Carlotta.

References

External links
 
 
 
 
 

1949 films
1949 crime drama films
1940s spy films
American crime drama films
American spy films
American black-and-white films
Film noir
Films scored by Miklós Rózsa
Films directed by Robert Z. Leonard
Films set in the Caribbean
Films set on fictional islands
Metro-Goldwyn-Mayer films
1940s English-language films
1940s American films